Javier Gustavo Mazzoni (born 4 February 1972) is an Argentine retired footballer who played as a forward.

Football career
Born in Don Bosco, Buenos Aires, Mazzoni had a journeyman career after starting out at Club Atlético Independiente, going on to play top division football other than in his country with FC Nantes (France), FC Lausanne-Sport (Switzerland), Racing de Santander (Spain), Figueirense Futebol Clube (Brazil) and Montevideo Wanderers FC (Uruguay).

He retired in 2007, at the age of 35.

Honours
Independiente
Supercopa Libertadores: 1994, 1995

External links

1972 births
Living people
Sportspeople from Buenos Aires Province
Argentine footballers
Association football forwards
Argentine Primera División players
Club Atlético Independiente footballers
Olimpo footballers
Arsenal de Sarandí footballers
Club Atlético Tigre footballers
Ligue 1 players
FC Nantes players
Swiss Super League players
FC Lausanne-Sport players
La Liga players
Segunda División players
Racing de Santander players
Polideportivo Ejido footballers
Campeonato Brasileiro Série A players
Figueirense FC players
Uruguayan Primera División players
Montevideo Wanderers F.C. players
Argentine expatriate footballers
Expatriate footballers in France
Expatriate footballers in Switzerland
Expatriate footballers in Spain
Expatriate footballers in Brazil
Expatriate footballers in Uruguay
Argentine expatriate sportspeople in France
Argentine expatriate sportspeople in Switzerland
Argentine expatriate sportspeople in Spain
Argentine expatriate sportspeople in Uruguay